Anne Baxter (May 7, 1923 – December 12, 1985) was an American actress, star of Hollywood films, Broadway productions, and television series. She won an Academy Award and a Golden Globe, and was nominated for an Emmy.

A granddaughter of Frank Lloyd Wright, Baxter studied acting with Maria Ouspenskaya and had some stage experience before making her film debut in 20 Mule Team (1940). She became a contract player of 20th Century Fox and was loaned to RKO Pictures for the role of Lucy Morgan in Orson Welles' The Magnificent Ambersons (1942), one of her earlier films. In 1947, she won both the Academy Award and the Golden Globe Award for Best Supporting Actress for her role as Sophie MacDonald in The Razor's Edge (1946). In 1951, she received an Academy Award nomination for Best Actress for the title role in All About Eve (1950). She worked with several of Hollywood's greatest directors, including Billy Wilder in Five Graves to Cairo (1943), Alfred Hitchcock in I Confess (1953), Fritz Lang in The Blue Gardenia (1953), and Cecil B. DeMille in The Ten Commandments (1956), for which she won a Laurel Award for Topliner Female Dramatic Performance.

Early life
Baxter was born May 7, 1923, in Michigan City, Indiana, to Catherine Dorothy ( Wright; 1894–1979), whose father was architect Frank Lloyd Wright, and Kenneth Stuart Baxter (1893–1977), an executive with the Seagram Company. When Baxter was five, she appeared in a school play. When she was six, her family moved to New York, where she continued to act. She was raised in Westchester County, New York and attended Brearley. 

At age 10, Baxter attended a Broadway play starring Helen Hayes, and she was so impressed that she declared to her family that she wanted to become an actress. By age 13, she had appeared on Broadway in Seen but Not Heard. During this period, Baxter learned her acting craft as a student of actress and teacher Maria Ouspenskaya. 

In 1939, she was cast as Katharine Hepburn's younger sister in the play The Philadelphia Story, but Hepburn did not like Baxter's acting style, and Baxter was replaced during the show's pre-Broadway run. Rather than giving up, she turned to Hollywood.

Career

20th Century Fox

At 16, Baxter screen-tested for the role of Mrs. DeWinter in Rebecca. Director Alfred Hitchcock deemed Baxter too young for the role, but she soon secured a seven-year contract with 20th Century Fox. In 1940, she was loaned to MGM for her first film 20 Mule Team, in which she was billed fourth after Wallace Beery, Leo Carrillo, and Marjorie Rambeau. She worked with John Barrymore in her next film The Great Profile (1940) and appeared as the ingénue in the Jack Benny vehicle Charley's Aunt (1941). She received star billing in Swamp Water (1941) and The Pied Piper (1942), which was nominated for the Academy Award for Best Picture.

Baxter was loaned to RKO to appear in director Orson Welles' The Magnificent Ambersons (1942). She was Tyrone Power's leading lady in Crash Dive (1943), her first Technicolor film. In 1943, she played a French maid in a North African hotel (with a French accent) in Billy Wilder's Five Graves to Cairo, a Paramount production. She became a popular star in World War II dramas and received top billing in The North Star (1943), The Sullivans (1944), The Eve of St. Mark (1944), and Sunday Dinner for a Soldier (1944), co-starring her future husband John Hodiak. Baxter later recalled, "I was getting almost as much mail as Betty Grable. I was our boys' idealized girl next door."

She was loaned to United Artists for the leading role in the film noir Guest in the House (1944), and appeared in A Royal Scandal (1945), with Tallulah Bankhead and Charles Coburn; Smoky (1946), with Fred MacMurray; Angel on My Shoulder (1946), with Paul Muni and Claude Rains.

Baxter co-starred with Tyrone Power and Gene Tierney in 1946's The Razor's Edge, for which she won both the Academy Award and the Golden Globe Award for Best Supporting Actress. Baxter later recounted that The Razor's Edge contained her only great performance, a hospital scene where the character Sophie "loses her husband, child and everything else." She said she relived the death of her brother, who had died at age three.

She was loaned to Paramount for a top-billed role opposite William Holden in Blaze of Noon (1947) and to MGM for a supporting role as Clark Gable's wife in Homecoming (1948). Back at 20th Century Fox, she played a wide variety of roles: a lawyer in love with Cornel Wilde in The Walls of Jericho (1948); Tyrone Power's Irish romantic interest in The Luck of the Irish (1948); a tomboy in Yellow Sky (1948), with Gregory Peck and Richard Widmark; a 1920s flapper in You're My Everything (1949), with Dan Dailey; and another tomboy in A Ticket to Tomahawk (1950), again with Dailey.

In 1950, Baxter was chosen to co-star in All About Eve largely because of a resemblance to Claudette Colbert, who originally was cast but dropped out and was replaced by Bette Davis. The original idea was to have Baxter's character gradually come to mirror Colbert's over the course of the film. Baxter received an Academy Award nomination for Best Actress for the title role of Eve Harrington. She said she modeled the role on a bitchy understudy she had for her debut performance in the Broadway play Seen but Not Heard at the age of 13 and who had threatened to "finish her off."

Her next Fox film Follow the Sun (1951) co-starred Glenn Ford as champion golfer Ben Hogan; Baxter played Hogan's wife Valerie. She was top-billed in the western The Outcasts of Poker Flat (1950), with Dale Robertson, and was part of an ensemble cast in O. Henry's Full House (1952), her last project for Fox.  The comedy My Wife's Best Friend, with MacDonald Carey, was her second and last Fox film released in 1952. Baxter left 20th Century Fox in 1953.

Freelance
In 1953, Baxter contracted a two-picture deal for Warner Brothers. Her first was opposite Montgomery Clift in Alfred Hitchcock's I Confess; the second was the Fritz Lang whodunit The Blue Gardenia, in which she played a woman accused of murder.

In June 1954, Baxter won the part of the Egyptian princess and queen Nefertari in Cecil B. DeMille's award-winning The Ten Commandments. Her scenes were shot on Paramount's sound stages in 1955, and she attended the film's New York and Los Angeles premieres in November 1956. Despite criticisms of her interpretation of Nefertari, DeMille and The Hollywood Reporter both thought her performance was "very good," and The New York Daily News described her as "remarkably effective." For her work in The Ten Commandments, she won a Laurel Award for Topliner Female Dramatic Performance. She later remembered the film in an interview:

In 1960, Baxter received a motion pictures star on the Hollywood Walk of Fame at 6741 Hollywood Boulevard.

Later career
Baxter worked regularly in television in the 1960s. She appeared as one of the mystery guests on What's My Line? She also starred as guest villain Zelda The Great in episodes 9 and 10 of the Batman series. She appeared as another villain, Olga, Queen of the Cossacks, opposite Vincent Price's Egghead in three episodes of the show's third season. She  played an old flame of Raymond Burr on his crime series Ironside. Baxter made a guest appearance on My Three Sons season 8 episode 10, aired on November 4, 1967, called "Designing Woman", portraying a glamorous female engineer who wanted Steve Douglas (Fred MacMurray) as a love interest and possible future husband.

Baxter returned to Broadway during the 1970s in Applause, the musical version of All About Eve, but this time as Margo Channing (succeeding Lauren Bacall).

In the 1970s, Baxter was a frequent guest and guest host on The Mike Douglas Show. She portrayed a murderous film star on an episode of Columbo, titled "Requiem for a Falling Star". In 1971, she had a role in Fools' Parade as an aging prostitute. In 1983, Baxter starred in the television series Hotel, ironically replacing iconic former film costar Bette Davis (All About Eve) after Davis became ill.

Personal life

Baxter married actor John Hodiak on July 7, 1946, at her parents' home in Burlingame, California. The couple had one daughter, Katrina, born in 1951. They divorced in 1953. At the time, she said they were "basically incompatible", but in her book she blamed herself for the separation: "I had loved John as much", she wrote. "But we'd eventually congealed in the longest winter in the world. Daily estrangement. Things unsaid. Even a fight would have warmed us. To my shame, I'd picked one at last in order to unfreeze the word 'divorce'."

In the mid-1950s, Baxter began a relationship with Gambino gangster Filippo Autelitano and later, her publicist Russell Birdwell, who took control of her career and directed her in The Come On (1956).  The couple formed Baxter-Birdwell Productions to make films on a 10-year plan; Baxter would star in the films and Birdwell would work behind the camera. Princeton University Library has a collection of 175 letters by Baxter to Birdwell.

In 1960, Baxter married her second husband Randolph Galt, an American owner of a cattle station at Gloucester near Sydney, where she was filming Summer of the Seventeenth Doll. After the birth of their second daughter, Maginel, back in California, Galt unexpectedly announced that they were moving to a 4,452 hectare (11,000 acre) ranch south of Grants, New Mexico.  They then moved to Hawaii (his home state) before settling back in Brentwood, California. Baxter and Galt were divorced in 1969. In 1976, Baxter recounted her courtship with Galt (whom she called "Ran") in a well-received book called Intermission. Melissa Galt, Baxter's first daughter with Galt, became an interior designer and then a business coach, speaker, and seminar provider. Maginel became a cloistered Catholic nun, reportedly living in Rome.

In 1977, Baxter married David Klee, a stockbroker. It was a brief marriage; Klee died unexpectedly from illness. The newlywed couple had purchased a sprawling property in Easton, Connecticut, which they extensively remodeled; however, Klee did not live to see the renovations completed. Although she maintained a residence in West Hollywood, Baxter considered her Connecticut home to be her primary residence.

Baxter was a Republican who was active in the campaigns of Thomas E. Dewey and Dwight D. Eisenhower.

Death
Baxter had a stroke on December 4, 1985, while hailing a taxi on Madison Avenue in New York City. Baxter remained on life support for eight days in New York's Lenox Hill Hospital, until family members agreed that brain function had ceased. She died on December 12, aged 62. Baxter is buried on the estate of Frank Lloyd Wright at the Unity Chapel cemetery in the town of   Wyoming, south of Spring Green, Wisconsin. The cemetery is the private cemetery of the Lloyd Jones family, Baxter's mother's side of the family.

Awards and nominations

Filmography

Radio appearances

See also
 List of actors with Academy Award nominations

References

External links

 
 
 
 
 Photographs and literature
 

1923 births
1985 deaths
20th Century Studios contract players
20th-century American actresses
Actresses from Indiana
Actresses from New York City
American film actresses
American stage actresses
American television actresses
Best Supporting Actress Academy Award winners
Best Supporting Actress Golden Globe (film) winners
Burials in Wisconsin
People from Michigan City, Indiana
Frank Lloyd Wright
20th-century American writers
Deaths from intracranial aneurysm
People from Brentwood, Los Angeles
People from Easton, Connecticut
Brearley School alumni
California Republicans
Connecticut Republicans
New York (state) Republicans
People from Spring Green, Wisconsin